Jessica Leung Ka-sin (born 1993) is a barrister and politician in Hong Kong. She is the secretary general of the Civic Party.

Academic record
 Bachelor of Social Science (Government and Laws) and Bachelor of Laws (double degree) at the University of Hong Kong

References

1993 births
Living people
Alumni of the University of Hong Kong
Barristers of Hong Kong
Civic Party politicians